LiveSOS is the first live album by Australian pop rock band 5 Seconds of Summer, which was released on 15 December 2014. The album consists of 14 live tracks from the band's debut album 5 Seconds of Summer and EP She Looks So Perfect, and a studio mix of "What I Like About You". There's also two bonus tracks, a live version of "Don't Stop" and Kiss Me Kiss Me as iTunes and Target exclusives respectively. To promote the album, the studio version of "What I Like About You" will be serviced to contemporary hit radio in December 2014 as the lead single from LiveSOS. It was nominated at the 2015 ARIA Music Awards for Best Group, but lost to Tame Impala for Currents.

Background
On 22 November, the band announced through various social networks, and later, through the official website that they would release a live album, featuring songs from their debut album 5 Seconds of Summer, and their EPs.
This is the band's first live album and follows their debut studio album released earlier in 2014.
On the album, they commented, "Playing live has been something we have been the most passionate about from the beginning. All we want is for our fans to come to the shows, rock out and have one of the best times they've ever experienced. Also when a room is full of you guys from all different walks of life, you can let it go when you come to the shows and be free to be yourself. Our live album 'LIVESOS' is now available to preorder on iTunes or our webstore in the USA, Canada & Mexico. Everywhere else can from midnight this Sunday 23 October. It has 15 tracks recorded in different venues around the world! Anyways we love you, this is us live... You rule!"

Recording and composition
The 16 live tracks (including bonus tracks) were all recorded throughout 2014 concerts given by the band, during their headline shows in Europe, North America, and Australia.

B-side
The B-side was released in 2016 which contains three tracks: "500 Years of Winter - Pizza Song - Live", "Don’t Stop - Live", and "What I Like About You - Studio Mix".

Track listing

Notes
"Don't Stop" appears between "American Idiot" and "Teenage Dream" on the Target exclusive version
"Kiss Me Kiss Me" appears between "American Idiot" and "Teenage Dream" on the iTunes version
Physical releases of the album include the hidden live track "Pizza"

Charts

Weekly charts

Year-end charts

Certifications

References

External links
Official Website
iTunes USA

2014 live albums
Capitol Records live albums
Live albums by Australian artists
5 Seconds of Summer albums